Char Satiner Ghar (Eng : Four Wive's Forum) is a 2005 social awareness Bengali film directed by Nargis Akhter, based on the story 'Hridoy O Sromer Songsar' by Selina Hossain. The gist of the movie was 'Parents are responsible for having children both ways, and extra marriage can't cure it'. Alamgir, Bobita, Diti, Shabnur, Mayuri and many others Bangladeshi actors have acted in it.

Storyline 
Khan Saheb i.e. Kashem Khan is a respected and rich man of the village. Although he has a lot of wealth, but none of this huge wealth. And that heir got married four times in a row in the hope of having children but still failed to have children. At first he thought his wives were infertile women, which tempted him to marry again and again. But he surrenders to his last wife, the stubborn Phulbanu Jade, and seeks the help of a doctor, and only then does he realize that it is not his wife's fault for giving birth but his own disability.

Cast 
 Alamgir as Kashem Khan (Khan Shaheb).
 Bobita as Khan Shaheb's first wife.
 Diti as Khan Shaheb's second wife.
 Moyuri as Khan Shaheb's third wife.
 Shabnur as Fulbanu (Khan Shaheb's fourth wife).
 Mahfuz Ahmed as Mazhi (Boatman).
 Dany Sidak as Kalu (Khan house's servant).
 Amir Shirazi as Fulbanu's father.
 Rasheda Chowdhury as Fulbanu's mother.
 Suchorita as doctor.
 Rani Sarkar
 Zamilur Rahman Shakha as Kazi Shaheb.
 Serajul Karim (as Sirajul Karim).
 Shamima Nazneen.
 Nauha Munir Dihan (as Dihan).
 Upama Moti Banu (as Upoma).
 Sufia.
 Kamola Rani Das.
 Syed Akhtar Ali
 Milon
 Sayem Samad (as Syem Samad).
 Rabindranath
 Jahangir
 Milu
 Sarowar
 Abdul Haque
 Selim Haider
 Babul Chowdhury
 Abdul Karim Old boatman (as Karim).
 Moshi
 Promit

Reference

External links

Films directed by Nargis Akhter
Films scored by Alauddin Ali
2000s Bengali-language films
Bengali-language Bangladeshi films